Adam Peter Augustus Clarke (born 13 September 1984) is an English cricketer.  Clarke is a right-handed batsman who bowls right-arm medium-fast.  He was born in Greenwich, London.

While studying for his degree at Durham University, Clarke made his only first-class appearance for Durham UCCE against Northamptonshire in 2004.  In this match, he was dismissed for a duck in the university's first-innings by Robert White, while with the ball he bowled 5.4 wicket-less overs.

References

External links
Adam Clarke at ESPNcricinfo
Adam Clarke at CricketArchive

1984 births
Living people
People from Greenwich
Alumni of Durham University
English cricketers
Durham MCCU cricketers